The 1901 Southern Intercollegiate Athletic Association football season was the college football games played by the member schools of the Southern Intercollegiate Athletic Association as part of the 1901 college football season. The season began on September 28.

Amidst charges of professionalism, Georgia Tech and Nashville were blacklisted.  The 1901 game of LSU versus Tulane eventually ended up as a forfeiture.  Tulane forfeited the game the November 16 due to a ruling from the SIAA.  The 1901 edition of the Battle for the Flag against LSU was originally a 22-0 victory for Tulane. It was later forfeited after a petition to the SIAA, and was recorded as a 0-11 loss for Tulane.  After the game, LSU protested to the Southern Intercollegiate Athletic Association, and alleged that Tulane had used a professional player during the game.  Several months later, the SIAA ruled the game an 11-0 forfeit in favor of LSU.

The 1901 team was likely the best football team in Nashville's history. Coached by Charley Moran, though they lost to southern power Vanderbilt, they "mopped up with about everything else."

Season overview

Results and team statistics

Key

PPG = Average of points scored per game
PAG = Average of points allowed per game

Regular season

SIAA teams in bold.

Unknown

Week One

Week Two

Week Three

Week Four

Week Five

Week Six

Week Seven

Week Eight

Week Nine

Awards and honors

All-Southerns

HB - Ormond Simkins, Sewanee (O)

References